Taxco de Alarcón  is one of the 81 municipalities of Guerrero, in south-western Mexico. The municipal seat lies at Taxco de Alarcón.  The municipality covers an area of 347 km².

In 2005, the municipality had a total population of 98,854. 

The city of Taxco de Alarcón is the seat and the governing authority for 141 other communities, the largest of which are Tlamacazapa, Acamixtla, Acuitlalpan, Atzala and Taxco el Viejo. The total population of the municipality is 98,854, and the territory measures 347km2.  Less than 3% of the population of the municipality is of pure indigenous ethnicity according to the Census. The two indigenous languages spoken here are Nahuatl and Zapotec. It borders with the municipalities of Tetipac, Iguala, Teloloapan, Buena Vista de Cuellar, Pedro Ascencio Alquisiras and Ixcateopan as well at the state of Morelos

The terrain has an average altitude of 1,752 meters, which ranges from 1,000 meters to 2,300 meters.  Seventy five percent of its territory consists of rugged mountains, twenty percent is semi-flat and only five percent is flat. The flatter lands are in the lower elevations. The major rivers here are the Taxco and the Temixco, with a number of arroyos that feed into them during the rainy season. There is a lake that is filled only part of the year and a small dam called San Marcos. 
 
The climate in Taxco ranges from hot and relatively moist in the flatlands to warm and relatively moist in the higher mountainous areas. Average temperatures for the year range between 18 and 20 C. Most of the municipality is covered in semi-tropical foliage which has a tendency to drop leaves during the dry season from October to May. In the highest elevations, pine and oak forests can be found.

Most of the municipality's natural resources lie underground in the form of gold, silver, lead, copper, and zinc deposits. Above ground a number of species of timber trees exist as well as areas for agriculture and livestock. Principle crops grown in the municipality are corn, peanuts, luffa sponges, beans and tomatillos. Livestock consists of pigs, goats, horses and some fowl. Most of the industry here revolves around mining precious metals as well as the manufacture of drywall and masonry materials.

Demography

Government

Municipal presidents

References

Municipalities of Guerrero